Anti-Heroes is an album by saxophonist Lee Konitz and pianist Gil Evans recorded in New York in 1980 and released on the French Verve label.

Critical reception

The Allmusic review stated "the music is rather disappointing for, although Konitz plays fairly well on the mixture of standards and obscurities, Evans often wanders and his backing of the saxophonist is sparse and erratic. The results are more important historically than musically".

Track listing 
 "Orange Was the Color of Her Dress, Then Blue Silk" (Charles Mingus) - 8:53
 "The Moon Struck One" (Robbie Robertson) - 9:18
 "" (Masabumi Kikuchi) - 6:30
 "Gee, Baby, Ain't I Good to You" (Andy Razaf, Don Redman) - 9:02
 "The Buzzard Song" (George Gershwin, Ira Gershwin, DuBose Heyward) - 5:11
 "How Insensitive" (Antônio Carlos Jobim, Vinícius de Moraes) - 9:53
 "Copenhagen Sight" (Gil Evans) - 4:49

Personnel 
Lee Konitz – alto saxophone, soprano saxophone
Gil Evans – piano

References 

Lee Konitz live albums
Gil Evans live albums
Verve Records live albums
1991 live albums